Malcolm John Eadie Fraser (4 March 1860 – 8 January 1886) was a Scottish international footballer who played for Queen's Park and Scotland in the 1870s and 1880s.

Fraser was born in Goderich, Ontario, the son of a Scottish Presbyterian minister. Returning to Scotland as a boy, he was brought up in Glasgow. A talented footballer, he won five caps for Scotland between 1880 and 1883, scoring four goals in the process. At Queen's Park he won two Scottish Cup medals in 1881 and 1882 plus three Glasgow Merchants Charity Cups, and was club secretary in 1882–83.

He died in Sydney, Australia of tuberculosis shortly after arriving on a sea journey from Scotland, having been sent there in an effort to cure the effects of the illness, which he contracted while working in Nigeria.

See also
 List of Scotland international footballers born outside Scotland

References

External links
 

1860 births
1886 deaths
Scottish footballers
Association football outside forwards
Scotland international footballers
Queen's Park F.C. players
Canadian soccer players
Pre-Confederation Canadian emigrants to the United Kingdom
Canadian expatriate soccer players
Canadian expatriate sportspeople in Scotland
Sportspeople from Ontario
Footballers from Glasgow
Scottish expatriate footballers
19th-century deaths from tuberculosis
Scottish expatriates in Australia
People from Goderich, Ontario
Canadian expatriates in Australia
Tuberculosis deaths in Australia
Infectious disease deaths in New South Wales